Garance is a given name that is derived from , which is the French name of the plant Rubia tinctorum. Notable people with the name include:

 Garance Doré (born 1975), French photographer
 Garance Genicot (born 1974), Belgian-American economist 
 Garance Le Guillermic (born 1997), French actress
 Garance Marillier (born 1998), French actress